Crassicheles is a genus of mites in the family Eviphididae. There are at least two described species in Crassicheles.

Species
These two species belong to the genus Crassicheles:
 Crassicheles concentricus (Oudemans, 1904)
 Crassicheles holstaticus (Willmann, 1937)

References

Mesostigmata
Articles created by Qbugbot
Taxa named by Wolfgang Karg